The 1988 Australian referendum was held on 3 September 1988. It contained four referendum questions, none of which passed.


Results in detail

Parliamentary Terms
This section is an excerpt from 1988 Australian referendum (Parliamentary Terms) § Result

Fair Elections 
This section is an excerpt from 1988 Australian referendum (Fair Elections) § Results

Local Government 
This section is an excerpt from 1988 Australian referendum (Local Government) § Results

Rights and Freedoms 
This section is an excerpt from 1988 Australian referendum (Rights and Freedoms) § Results

See also
Referendums in Australia
Politics of Australia
History of Australia

References

Further reading
  
 .
 Australian Electoral Commission (2007) Referendum Dates and Results 1906 – Present AEC, Canberra.

1988 referendums
1988
Referendum
September 1988 events in Australia